José João Manuel is the ambassador of Angola to Israel.

See also
Angola–Israel relations
Politics of Angola
Politics of Israel

References

Angolan diplomats
Ambassadors of Angola to Israel
Living people
Year of birth missing (living people)
Place of birth missing (living people)